Sebastian Korda was the defending champion but chose not to defend his title.

Borna Ćorić won the title after defeating Elias Ymer 7–6(7–4), 6–0 in the final.

Seeds

Draw

Finals

Top half

Bottom half

References

External links
Main draw
Qualifying draw

Emilia-Romagna Open - 1
2022 Singles